Winn Aung (also spelt Win Aung, born 15 October 1958) is a Burmese politician, physician and former political prisoner who currently serves as a Pyithu Hluttaw MP for the Khin-U constituency. He is a member of the National League for Democracy.

Early life and education
Winn Aung was born on 15 October 1958 in Kanbalu Township, Myanmar. In 1982, he graduated from the University of Medicine, Mandalay with an M.B.,B.S. degree.

Political career
In the 2015 Myanmar general election, he was elected to Pyithu Hluttaw as an MP from the Khin-U constituency. He currently serves as a member in the Government Commitments Assessment Committee in the Pyithu Hluttaw.

References

National League for Democracy politicians
1985 births
Living people
People from Sagaing Region